Turre is a municipality of Almería province, in the autonomous community of Andalusia, Spain.

Demographics

History of Turre
Turre was originally a Moorish settlement created after the invading Christian armies of the Catholic Monarchs expelled the Moors from the nearby village of Mojacar in 1488. It was originally called Turris, after the Latin for "tower", probably because there was a watchtower at the location of the new settlement.

English Language books about Turre
Turre - a history.
In 2015 local author David Jackson published a history of the village which follows the evolution of Turre from its founding up to the modern day.

References

External links
  Turre - Sistema de Información Multiterritorial de Andalucía
  Turre - Diputación Provincial de Almería

Municipalities in the Province of Almería